Rowgir-e Hasani (also Romanized as Rūgīr-e Ḩasanī; also known as Rūgīr-e ’asanī) is a village in Kheyrgu Rural District, Alamarvdasht District, Lamerd County, Fars Province, Iran. At the 2006 census, its population was 281, in 64 families.

References 

Populated places in Lamerd County